El cristal empañado (English title: The fogged crystal) is a Mexican telenovela  produced by José Rendón for Televisa in 1989.

Mariagna Prats and Jaime Garza starred as protagonists, while Magda Guzmán starred as main antagonist.

Plot 
The story focuses specifically on the life of two women, Paulina, and Virginia who are also raw. Virginia is a woman more, bitter and envious since childhood of the attributes of his cousin, once famous and now decaying vedette. Virginia lives with his daughter Mercedes of butted in the House of Paulina. As well as Virginia seek every day find way utterly destroy his cousin, Paulina is passed the depressed life and longing for their glorious past. It has come to cover the mirrors in his house by the asco causing him to look like it is now, and just look at their posters which appeared in his best years, radiant and beautiful dancing in cabarets of first category.

Cast 
 Mariagna Prats as Raquel/Yolanda
 Jaime Garza as Jacinto
 Magda Guzmán as Virginia
 Dina de Marco as Paulina
 Leticia Perdigón as Mercedes
 Manuel Landeta as Claudio
 Diana Golden as Alicia
 Meche Barba as Yolanda
 Héctor Cruz Lara as Mario
 Fernando Sáenz as Adrián
 Magda Karina as Luisa
 Karina Duprez as Karla
 Graciela Lara as Josefina
 Jazmín Athie as Maribel
 Yoshio as Comandante Molina
 Laura Forastieri as Isabel
 Fidel Garriga as Salazar
 Francisco Avendaño as Arturo
 Carmen Delgado as Marisela
 Mónica Prado as Eugenia
 Alicia Osorio as Amparo
 Maripaz Banquells as Paulina (young)
 Javier Díaz Dueñas as Leopoldo
 Rafael Banquells as Luciano
 Manuel Servín as Dr. Barrera

References

External links 

1989 telenovelas
Mexican telenovelas
Televisa telenovelas
1989 Mexican television series debuts
1989 Mexican television series endings
Spanish-language telenovelas
Television shows set in Mexico City